Two ships of the Royal Navy have borne the name HMS Varne:

  was a U-class submarine launched in 1943.
  was a V-class submarine launched in 1944 and handed over for breaking up in 1948.

Royal Navy ship names